Troy Price is an American political strategist and LGBTQ rights advocate who served as the chair of the Iowa Democratic Party from his election in July 2017 until his resignation in February 2020. Price worked in the administration of Iowa Governor Chet Culver, and later served as a press aide for Tom Vilsack. Price served as Iowa Director for the Barack Obama 2012 presidential campaign and the Hillary Clinton 2016 presidential campaign.

Early life and education 
Price was raised in Durant, Iowa, where he attended Durant High School. He then graduated from the University of Iowa with a Bachelor of Arts in Political Science and Government in 2004. After graduating from college, Price became active in the Iowa caucus process.

Price identifies as gay.

Career 
Price was the executive director of One Iowa, an LGBTQ advocacy organization, before stepping down to work on the Barack Obama 2012 presidential campaign. He was a proponent for marriage equality in Iowa. In October 2018, Price was re-elected Chair of the Iowa Democratic Party. During his tenure as Chair, Price appeared on NPR and C-SPAN. Price was selected as a "key player of the 2020 Iowa Democratic caucuses" by The Des Moines Register, and has been featured in The New York Times, Politico, and NBC News.

On February 12, 2020, Troy Price announced his resignation as chairman of the Iowa Democratic Party, following the controversy over the delay in the final results of the 2020 Iowa Democratic caucuses. This delay is reported to be a factor in the Democratic National Committee voting to remove Iowa's First in the Nation status for the 2024 presidential nominating calendar. Price officially left office after Mark Smith, a current member of the Iowa House of Representatives, was selected as his successor by the Iowa Democratic Party.  On August 16, 2021, Price began working as executive director of the New Hampshire Democratic Party. In 2023, the Democratic National Committee voted to removed New Hampshire's early-state status for the 2024 presidential nominating calendar.

References

External links 

 
 

1980s births
Living people
Activists from Iowa
American political consultants
Barack Obama 2012 presidential campaign
American gay men
Hillary Clinton 2016 presidential campaign
Iowa Democratic caucuses
Iowa Democratic Party
Iowa Democrats
LGBT people from Iowa
American LGBT rights activists
People from Cedar County, Iowa
State political party chairs of Iowa
University of Iowa alumni